Carlos Manuel Martínez Castro (born 30 March 1999) is a Costa Rican footballer who plays as a defender or midfielder for San Carlos. He is a Costa Rica international.

Career

In 2015, Martínez joined the Aspire Academy in Senegal, becoming the second Costa Rican to join the academy.

In 2017, he signed for Belgian side Eupen.

In 2019, Martínez signed for Guadalupe in Costa Rica, where he made 31 league appearances and scored 0 goals.

References

External links
 
 

Living people
1999 births
Costa Rican footballers
Association football midfielders
Association football defenders
K.A.S. Eupen players
C.S. Herediano footballers
Guadalupe F.C. players
A.D. San Carlos footballers
Liga FPD players
Challenger Pro League players
Costa Rican expatriate footballers
Costa Rican expatriate sportspeople in Senegal
Costa Rican expatriate sportspeople in Belgium
Expatriate footballers in Senegal
Expatriate footballers in Belgium
Costa Rican people of Nicaraguan descent
People from Santa Ana Canton
2022 FIFA World Cup players